Nasi kari (lit. curry rice) is an Indonesian rice dish from Acehnese, Minangkabau and Malay as well as Javanese cuisine. This rice dish is popular in Sumatra and Java, Indonesia.

Nasi kari comprises the following:
 Steamed rice, ketupat or lontong.
 Curry, it can be rendang, gulai, opor ayam, gudeg, chicken curry, mutton curry, goat curry, shrimp curry or fish head curry.
 Sambal, spicy sauce or paste.
 Acar, traditional vegetable pickles.
 Bawang goreng, deep fried shallots.

See also

 Cuisine of Indonesia
 Rendang
 Rice and curry

References

Indonesian rice dishes
Indonesian curries
Curry dishes